The canton of La Roche-sur-Yon-1 is an administrative division of the Vendée department, western France. It was created at the French canton reorganisation which came into effect in March 2015. Its seat is in La Roche-sur-Yon.

It consists of the following communes:
Dompierre-sur-Yon
Landeronde
Mouilleron-le-Captif
La Roche-sur-Yon (partly)
Venansault

References

Cantons of Vendée